Raymont LaShawn Harris (born December 23, 1970) is a former American football running back.  He played college football at Ohio State University.  Harris played professionally for six seasons in the National Football League (NFL) between 1994 and 2000 with the Chicago Bears, the Green Bay Packers, the Denver Broncos and the New England Patriots.  He was nicknamed the "Ultraback" because of his versatility. He is currently director of development for The Ohio State University Department of Athletics.

College career
Harris attended Ohio State University, where he set the school record for most rushing yards in a bowl game (235) and finished his career at Ohio State as the school's sixth-leading rusher of all time. Harris finished his career with 2,649 yards rushing and is  currently still ranked fourth in most yards in a single game (235 versus BYU) and eighth all-time in single season rushing attempts (1993). He graduated with a Bachelor of Arts degree in communications.

NFL career
Harris was selected in the fourth round of the 1994 NFL Draft with the 114th overall pick by the Chicago Bears.  He subsequently became the starting fullback for the Bears after Merril Hoge suffered a career-ending injury. Harris became an integral part of the 1994 Chicago Bears playoff team. He went on to lead the Bears in rushing for the 1996  NFL season. His career best season came in 1997 where he had a career-high of 276 rushing carries for 1,033 rushing yards. He also finished tied for sixth in the NFL with ten rushing touchdowns.

Harris left the Bears after the 1997 season.  The rest of his career was plagued by injuries, causing him to miss the 1999 season. He spent the final two years of his career with three teams.  He retired in 2001 with 2,509 career rushing yards, 114 receptions for 739 yards, and 17 touchdowns.

Life after football
Harris joined The Ohio State University Department of Athletics in March 2010 as Director of Development. He was responsible for major gifts for all athletic priorities, including endowments and capital projects. He retired from OSU in September 2022. 

Before going to the Department of Athletics, Harris served as Assistant Director of Development for the Fisher College of Business. In his time at Fisher, Harris oversaw their annual fund, managed the Fisher share holders, and worked to develop the Fisher Commons.

Raymont currently is the CEO of a coaching and executive consulting company he owns called Elite Mindset and Performance (EMP). He is also a professional speaker and does keynote speaking engagements for football teams, athletic teams, organizations, events, meetings and more. His website is: www.raymontharris.com

References

1970 births
Living people
American football running backs
Chicago Bears players
Denver Broncos players
Green Bay Packers players
New England Patriots players
Ohio State Buckeyes football players
Ohio State University staff
Sportspeople from Lorain, Ohio
Sportspeople from Greater Cleveland
Players of American football from Ohio
Brian Piccolo Award winners